Hasanabad-e Sofla may refer to:
 Hasanabad-e Sofla, Fars
 Hasanabad-e Sofla, Semirom, Isfahan Province
 Hasanabad-e Sofla, Kerman
 Hasanabad-e Sofla, Kermanshah

See also
Hasanabad-e Pain